is a former Japanese football player.

Club career
Kurokawa was born in Saijo on April 7, 1981. After graduating from high school, he joined Shimizu S-Pulse in 2000. He debuted in 2000 and his opportunity to play increased on behalf of veteran goalkeeper Masanori Sanada. However he could hardly play in the match, since Yohei Nishibe came to S-Pulse in 2004. Although he moved to Tokyo Verdy and JEF United Chiba in 2006, he could not play in the match at all. He moved to Regional Leagues club Japan Soccer College in 2007. He played many matches and moved to Albirex Niigata. However he could hardly play in the match, as he was the team's reserve goalkeeper behind Takashi Kitano (2008-09), Masaaki Higashiguchi (2010-13) and Tatsuya Morita (2014-16). He retired end of 2016 season.

National team career
In June 2001, Kurokawa was selected Japan U-20 national team for 2001 World Youth Championship. But he did not play in the match, as he was the team's reserve goalkeeper behind Yosuke Fujigaya. In August 2004, he was selected Japan U-23 national team for 2004 Summer Olympics. But he did not play in the match, as he was the team's reserve goalkeeper behind Hitoshi Sogahata was selected as over aged.

Club statistics

References

External links

1981 births
Living people
Association football people from Ehime Prefecture
Japanese footballers
J1 League players
J2 League players
Shimizu S-Pulse players
Tokyo Verdy players
JEF United Chiba players
Japan Soccer College players
Albirex Niigata players
Olympic footballers of Japan
Footballers at the 2004 Summer Olympics
Asian Games medalists in football
Footballers at the 2002 Asian Games
Asian Games silver medalists for Japan
Association football goalkeepers
Medalists at the 2002 Asian Games